The following is a list of events including expected and scheduled events for the year 2023 in Australia.

Incumbents

Monarch – Charles III
Governor-General – David Hurley
Prime Minister – Anthony Albanese
Deputy Prime Minister – Richard Marles
Opposition Leader – Peter Dutton
Chief Justice – Susan Kiefel

State and Territory Leaders
Premier of New South Wales – Dominic Perrottet
Opposition Leader – Chris Minns 
Premier of Queensland – Annastacia Palaszczuk
Opposition Leader – David Crisafulli
Premier of South Australia – Peter Malinauskas
Opposition Leader – David Speirs
Premier of Tasmania – Jeremy Rockliff
Opposition Leader – Rebecca White
Premier of Victoria – Daniel Andrews
Opposition Leader – John Pesutto
Premier of Western Australia – Mark McGowan
Opposition Leader – Mia Davies (until 30 January), then Shane Love
Chief Minister of the Australian Capital Territory – Andrew Barr
Opposition Leader – Elizabeth Lee
Chief Minister of the Northern Territory – Natasha Fyles
Opposition Leader – Lia Finocchiaro

Governors and Administrators
Governor of New South Wales – Margaret Beazley
Governor of Queensland – Jeannette Young
Governor of South Australia – Frances Adamson 
Governor of Tasmania – Barbara Baker
Governor of Victoria – Linda Dessau
Governor of Western Australia – Chris Dawson
Administrator of the Australian Indian Ocean Territories – Natasha Griggs
Administrator of Norfolk Island – Eric Hutchinson
Administrator of the Northern Territory – Vicki O'Halloran (until 2 February), then Hugh Heggie

Events

January
 2 January – 2023 Gold Coast helicopter crash: A mid-air collision between two helicopters in Gold Coast, Queensland near Sea World kills four and injures nine.
 10–16 January – Western Australian radioactive capsule incident: A tiny radioactive capsule goes missing along a 1,400-kilometre stretch of the Great Northern Highway in Western Australia.
 12 January –
 Thomas Sewell is sentenced to an 18-month community corrections order with 150 hours of community for affray and recklessly causing injury.
 Liberal Premier of New South Wales – Dominic Perrottet reveals that he wore a Nazi uniform as fancy dress at his 21st birthday, apologising at a media conference after a cabinet minister was made aware of the incident.

February 
 1 February – Western Australian radioactive capsule incident: A search team from Australian Nuclear Science and Technology Organisation and the WA Department of Fire and Emergency Services finds the missing caesium-137 capsule 74 km (46 mi) south of Newman.
 2  February – the Reserve Bank of Australia announced that King Charles III will not appear on the new five-dollar banknote, a design celebrating First Nations peoples to appear instead.
 6 February – 2023 Coulson Aviation crash: A Boeing 737-300 serving as a firefighting air tanker crashes in the Fitzgerald River National Park in southern Western Australia.
 9 February – Former Liberal Minister for Education and Youth Alan Tudge announced his resignation in parliament, effective from the end of the following week.
 18 February – At a Country Liberal Party meeting, party members vote to oppose the Voice to Parliament.
 18 February - The World Club Challenge takes place with the Penrith Panthers losing by one point.
 23 February – The national campaign in favour of the Indigenous Voice to Parliament referendum officially begins at the Tandanya National Aboriginal Cultural Institute in Adelaide.

March 
 2 March – The 2023 NRL season commences, with Melbourne Storm defeating Parramatta Eels 16–12 at CommBank Stadium.
 5 March – The Dolphins play their inaugural NRL match, defeating Sydney Roosters 28–18.
 18 March – approximately 30 members of the National Socialist Network, including Thomas Sewell, attended a rally in Melbourne in support of British anti-transgender activist Kellie-Jay Keen-Minshull, who spoke at the rally while visiting the city on her Australian tour. Members of the NSN marched down Spring Street, displayed a banner that read "DESTROY PAEDO FREAKS", performed Nazi salutes on the stairs of Victorian Parliament House. A counterprotest in support of transgender rights, attended by many students, transgender activists, and socialists, clashed with the group. While the police, including several mounted officers, attempted to separate the two groups. The events were condemned by the Labor Party, the Liberal Party and the Greens.

Future and scheduled events
 25 March – New South Wales State election to elect 58th Parliament
 5 May – A penumbral lunar eclipse will be visible in the evening and the following morning in Africa, Asia and Australia, and will be the 24th lunar eclipse of Lunar Saros 141.
 11 May – Progressive metal band Voyager will represent Australia in the Eurovision Song Contest 2023 with the track "Promise".
 20 July–20 August – 2023 FIFA Women's World Cup

Deaths

January 

 4 January – Alan Mackay-Sim, biomedical scientist (b. 1951)
 6 January – David Penington, doctor and academic (b. 1930)
 7 January – Rob Heming, rugby union player (b. 1932)
 8 January – Slim Newton, country singer (b. 1932)
 10 January – George Pell, Catholic cardinal (b. 1941) (died in Italy)
 16 January – Jim Molan, New South Wales politician and military general (b. 1950)
 17 January – Renée Geyer, singer (b. 1953)
 21 January – 
 Simon Dunn, bobsledder (b. 1987)
 Gabrielle Williams, author of young adult fiction (b. 1963)
 22 January – 
 David Hains, businessman and horse breeder (b. 1931)
 Vaughan Johnson, Queensland politician (b. 1947)
 25 January – Duncan Pugh, bobsledder (born in United Kingdom) (b. 1974)
 26 January – Diana Fisher, media identity (b. 1931)
 28 January – Phil Coles, Olympic canoeist (b. 1931)
 29 January – John Devine, football player and coach (Geelong, North Hobart) (b. 1940)
 30 January – Ann Harding, economist (b. 1958)

February
 2 February – Richard Woolcott, diplomat (b. 1927)
 3 February – Portia Robinson, historian (b. 1926)
 5 February – Geoff Heskett, Olympic basketball player (1956) (b. 1929)
 22 February – Jeff Watson, journalist and documentary maker (b. 1942)
 23 February – Syd Fischer, property developer and sailor (b. 1927)

March
 1 March – Warren Saunders, cricketer (b. 1934)
 16 March – 
Stephen Bromhead, New South Wales politician (b. 1957)
Peter Hardy, actor (b. 1957)
Brian Walsh, television executive (b. c. 1954)
 17 March – James Goldrick, naval historian and officer (b. 1958)
 20 March – John Sattler, rugby league player (b. 1942)

See also

Country overviews
 2020s in Australia political history
 History of Australia
 History of modern Australia
 Outline of Australia
 Government of Australia
 Politics of Australia
 Years in Australia
 Timeline of Australia history
 2023 in Australian literature
 2023 in Australian television
 List of Australian films of 2023

References

External links

 Online calendar

 
Australia
Australia
2020s in Australia
Years of the 21st century in Australia